Raymond Terrace is a town in the Hunter Region of New South Wales, Australia, about  by road north of Newcastle on the Pacific Highway. Established in 1837 it is situated at the confluence of the Hunter and Williams rivers. The town was named after Lieutenant Raymond, who had explored the Hunter River in 1797 and described the terraced appearance of trees in the area. Governor Lachlan Macquarie camped in the area in 1818, using "Raymond Terrace" as the name for the place where his party had camped.

At the  Raymond Terrace had a population of 13,453. It is the administrative centre of the Port Stephens local government area as well as a service hub for surrounding rural areas.

Geography
Raymond Terrace is situated to the east of the Hunter and Williams rivers and consists of three distinct regions. The north and south regions are primarily rural/semi-rural and occupy approximately 74% of the town's land with only 3% of the population living in these areas. Most of the population lives in the town itself.

The centre of the town, where the shopping district is located, is adjacent to the Hunter River, just south of the confluence of the two rivers. Access to the northern sides of the rivers is via the Fitzgerald Bridge which crosses the Williams River immediately adjacent to and upstream of the confluence. When the Hunter River is in flood, access beyond the Fitzgerald Bridge to the northern side of the Williams River (i.e. to Nelsons Plains) is often not possible due to its low-lying nature. The town of Raymond Terrace is mostly protected by levee banks and other flood mitigation devices. However, some lower parts of the town still flood, as happened during the 2007 New South Wales storms.

In December 1998 a diversion of the Pacific Highway opened diverting traffic from the town centre. Most of the town now lies to the north-west of the bypass between the Hunter and Williams rivers. However, the suburb of Lakeside lies to the east of the bypass, between the bypass and the wall of Grahamstown Dam.

Climate
Raymond Terrace experiences a humid subtropical climate (Köppen: Cfa/Cfb, Trewartha: Cfbl/Cfal); with warm summers and mild winters; and with a moderately high precipitation amount of 1,143.4 millimetres (45.04 in), with moderate precipitation even during its drier months.

Demographics 
According to the 2021 census, there were 13,453 people in Raymond Terrace.

Services

Emergency services
All emergency service providers are represented in the town. In 2010 the police station was temporarily relocated to the site of the old Raymond Terrace Leisure Centre while a new station was being constructed on the site of the old station in William Street. The Fire & Rescue New South Wales fire station is located at the eastern edge of the town in Leisure Way, adjacent to Grahamstown Dam, while the New South Wales Ambulance ambulance station is located on Adelaide Street (old Pacific Highway), a short distance from the centre of the town. The New South Wales Rural Fire Service and State Emergency Service share a facility located North of the town between Rees James Road and the Pacific Highway. The nearest hospitals are the Calvary Mater and John Hunter hospitals in Newcastle to the southwest and Maitland Hospital in Maitland, to the northwest. All three are approximately 20–30 minutes driving time from the town.

Education
The town has four primary schools, St Brigid's Catholic, Raymond Terrace Public, Irrawang Public and Grahamstown Public, and two high schools, Irrawang High School and Hunter River High School, formerly known as Raymond Terrace High School.

Commerce and industry
There are two main shopping centres in the town centre which is based around William Street. The Raymond Terrace Marketplace, located north-east of William Street, was opened in 1998 while Terrace Central (formerly Centro Plaza, formerly Raymond Terrace Plaza) is located to the south-west. Both contain supermarkets and a variety of speciality shops and are within a short walking distance of each other on either side of William Street. The Raymond Terrace Marketplace also contains a Big W department store. Shops also line William Street and the adjacent Port Stephens Street and Sturgeon Street. On 29 May 2008 an Aldi supermarket opened at the corner of Port Stephens and Kangaroo streets, bringing the total number of supermarkets in the town to three, all within  of each other. In August 2011, it was announced that the Raymond Terrace Marketplace would be modernised and should be completed by late 2011.

A fleet of prawn trawlers based at Raymond Terrace conducts prawning from Raymond Terrace to Hexham.

Transport
Raymond Terrace is served by Hunter Valley Buses who operate both a town service and a service to Newcastle Interchange. Hunter Valley Buses operated a depot in Richardson Road until it was closed in 2000 with operations transferred to Thornton. Port Stephens Coaches operate services to Nelson Bay and Sydney. NSW TrainLink road coaches services from Newcastle Interchange to Taree call at Raymond Terrace as do Busways services from Hawks Nest to Newcastle.

Recreation

There are several competitive sporting teams based in the Raymond Terrace area. The Raymond Terrace Magpies are the town's local Rugby League team, participating in the Newcastle Rugby League Competition. The town is represented in cricket by the Lions, a club that participates in the Maitland District Cricket Two Day Competition, and the Port Stephens Pythons, that competes in the Maitland District Cricket One Day Competitions. Both teams play at the King Park Sporting Complex. Other popular sports within the town are soccer, netball, athletics, golf and lawn bowls. 

The Raymond Terrace Jets won the NSW Division One State Pennant in lawn bowls in 2022, defeating Warilla 61-60 in the final. The club is home to ex-Australian representatives Matthew Baus and Lee Schraner, the latter a world singles champion in 2019.

There are two licensed clubs, Muree Golf Club and the Raymond Terrace Bowling Club, as well as a number of public bars. The majority of the sporting fields are located near the centre of town, on land that runs along the Williams and Hunter Rivers with other sporting fields located in the suburb of Lakeside, adjacent to Grahamstown Dam.

There is a boat ramp adjacent to the Fitzgerald Bridge, which crosses the Williams River, and the area is popular with water skiers and fisherpeople.

Tomorrow, When the War Began

In June 2009, Screen Australia announced that it would fund the development of the feature film Tomorrow, When The War Began, based on the John Marsden novel of the same name. Raymond Terrace was chosen as a major location for producing the film as it is "a great country town". Historic King Street, the former main street of the town, was transformed from a normally quiet location into Main Street, Wirrawee. The street began its transformation in September 2009. Set areas included the "Wirrawee Cinema" and the Lee family's Thai restaurant. Filming began in King Street on 21 October 2009 and continued until 27 October 2009. Filming in other locations in the town ended on 6 November 2009.

Notes

References

External links 

 Raymond Terrace at Australian Explorer
 Raymond Terrace weather
 Raymond Terrace weather at Weather Underground

Suburbs of Port Stephens Council
Towns in the Hunter Region
1837 establishments in Australia
Populated places established in 1837
Hunter River (New South Wales)